Hipping is a  vineyard of the red slope in the municipality Nierstein in Germany. Located at the Rhenish Hessian Rhineterrace (Rhineland-Palatinate), wines of this vineyard can be marketed as "Großes Gewächs" or "Erste Lage", provided that other quality characteristics are fulfilled.

Terrain 
The Hipping vineyard extends along the Rhine north of Nierstein and south of Nackenheim. It is part of the large vineyard Rehbach of the Rheinhessen wine region and surrounds the exclusive site "Brudersberg" in southern direction and borders in the south on the location "Ölberg". The location is 90–160 m above NN. The slope gradient is up to 70% and the exposure to southeast, the incoming morning sun is particularly beneficial for Riesling. The soil is Rotliegend.

Due to its proximity to the Nierstein village centre, the Hipping is a frequently used area for wine festivals, in particular for the event "Weinpräsentation am Roten Hang" (Wine Presentation on the Red Slope) and vineyard tours of the local winegrowers.

Etymology 
The name of the location could be derived from the Middle High German "Hübel" for "hill" or from the tool "Hippe" for billhook. The interpretations are complex and ambiguous.

History 
The coronation of Queen Elizabeth II on 2 June 1953 was celebrated with a Riesling by Franz Karl Schmitt from this vineyard. A 2012 vintage Hipping Riesling of the winery Klaus Peter Keller, who had acquired exactly in 2010 the plot in the Hipping therefore became the official wine for the Diamond Jubilee of Elizabeth II, which the Queen celebrated in 2012.

Property 
Propertied in the Hipping are the VDP wineries St. Antony, Gunderloch and Klaus Peter Keller, as well as the wineries Georg Albrecht Schneider, J. & H.A. Strub, Schätzel and many more.

References

External links

 
 
 

Vineyards of Germany